Toby "Crash" Stevenson (born November 19, 1976 in Odessa, Texas) is an Olympic class pole vaulter from the United States. He is known for being the only pole vaulter in the international elite to wear a helmet during jumps.

Biography
While attending Permian High School, Stevenson set 24 high school records, taking three district championships, and winning the state title in 1995, when he was also the top-ranked 18-year-old pole vaulter in the world.  Stevenson later went on to graduate from Stanford University. He currently coaches pole vault and multi-event athletes, at the University of Washington.  Among the athletes he has coached is 2016 Olympic Champion Ekaterini Stefanidi.

Since the fall of 2002, Stevenson has been a resident athlete at the U.S. Olympic Training Center in Chula Vista, California.  He won the 2004 Olympic silver medal in pole vaulting, the 2003 Pan American Games gold medal, and the 2004 USA Indoor gold medal.

He is known for his emotional antics after a successful vault. He played his pole like a guitar after his silver medal vault.

On Friday, January 29, 2010, he officially retired from pole vaulting at the 2010 National Pole Vault Summit in Reno, NV.

From February, 2014, he is working as Head of Activity for Hammarby Athletics in Stockholm, Sweden.

After a four-year stint coaching at the University of Kentucky, where he coached Olivia Gruver to her second straight NCAA outdoor title, as well as coaching decathlete Tim Duckworth to both the NCAA decathlon and heptathlon crowns, Stevenson was named associate head track & field coach in charge of the jumps and multi-events at the University of Washington on July 11, 2018.

See also 
 6 metres club

References

External links
 
 Profile at USA Track & Field
 Toby Stevenson Takes Silver In Olympic Men's Pole Vault Competition
 Toby Stevenson Retires, Video

1976 births
Living people
American male pole vaulters
People from Odessa, Texas
Stanford Cardinal men's track and field athletes
Athletes (track and field) at the 2004 Summer Olympics
Athletes (track and field) at the 2003 Pan American Games
Medalists at the 2004 Summer Olympics
Track and field athletes from Texas
Pan American Games gold medalists for the United States
Olympic silver medalists for the United States in track and field
Pan American Games medalists in athletics (track and field)
Kentucky Wildcats track and field coaches
Medalists at the 2003 Pan American Games